Nankin may refer to:

Nanjing, capital of Jiangsu province of the People's Republic of China, formerly romanised as Nankin
Nankeen, a kind of pale yellowish cloth, originally made at Nanjing, China
Nankin bantam or Nankin is a British bantam breed of chicken
Nankin, Georgia, a community in the United States
Nankin, Queensland, a locality in the Shire of Livingstone, Queensland, Australia
Nankin Township, Michigan, parts of which became incorporated into Garden City, Inkster, and Wayne, Michigan, with the remainder of the township incorporated as the city of Westland, Michigan in 1966.